Turowo  is a village in the administrative district of Gmina Pisz, within Pisz County, Warmian-Masurian Voivodeship, in northern Poland.

The village has a population of 300.

Notable residents
 Gustav Sobottka (1886-1953), politician

References

Turowo